The International Gamers Awards is an award for strategy board games and historical simulation games.

Per their website, the IGAs were created to recognize outstanding games and designers, as well as the companies that publish them. The awards are truly international in scope, with committee members representing countries throughout the world. As such, it is our belief that these awards will truly select the ‘best of the best’ and come to be respected by not only hobbyists, but the general public at large. We hope that this will lead to greater exposure for these wonderful games to more and more people and help spread the word of the "wonderful world of gaming" on a global scale.

References

External links 
 International Gamers Awards home page.

Game awards
Board game awards